Thomas Wilfried Mayer (born 23 August 1995) is an Austrian footballer who plays as a winger for SKU Amstetten.

Career
On 14 September 2020, Mayer joined League One side Hull City on a two-year deal. On 16 August 2021, Mayer was released from his contract by Hull City and moved to SKU Amstetten.

Honours
Hull City
EFL League One Champions 2020–21

References

External links

 
 

Austrian footballers
Association football midfielders
LASK players
FC Juniors OÖ players
SV Ried players
SC Austria Lustenau players
Hull City A.F.C. players
2. Liga (Austria) players
SKU Amstetten players
Austrian Regionalliga players
Footballers from Linz
1995 births
Living people
Expatriate footballers in England
Austrian expatriate footballers
Austrian expatriate sportspeople in England